Justin Draper Wilcox (born November 12, 1976) is an American football coach and former player. Since 2017, he has been the head football coach of the California Golden Bears.

Early years
Born in Eugene, Oregon, Wilcox grew up as the younger of two sons on a family farm (wheat and cherries) in nearby Junction City. He played quarterback at Junction City High School and led the team to the 3A state title as a junior in 1993. He graduated in 1995 and considered Stanford and Arizona but followed family tradition and accepted a scholarship to Oregon under head coach Mike Bellotti.

Playing career
After redshirting his first year at Oregon, Wilcox found himself buried on the depth chart and switched to defensive back. A nickel back as a redshirt freshman, he lost most of the 1996 season to a knee injury. Wilcox became a fixture at safety until his senior season of 1999, when he was asked to fill a void at cornerback.  He was invited to an NFL training camp with the Washington Redskins in 2000, but did not make the final roster.  Wilcox graduated from Oregon in 1999 with a degree in anthropology.

Coaching career

Assistant coaching career
Wilcox began his career as a college football coach in 2001 as a graduate assistant at Boise State, under new head coach Dan Hawkins. After two seasons as a graduate assistant, he left for the Bay Area to coach the linebackers at California under head coach Jeff Tedford. After three seasons at Cal, Wilcox returned to Boise State in 2006 as the defensive coordinator under new head coach Chris Petersen. In four years the teams lost only four games, with a  record, and his defenses were statistically among the highest-rated in the nation.

Following the 2009 season, Wilcox accepted the defensive coordinator job at Tennessee under new head coach Derek Dooley. In late December 2010, it was reported that Wilcox was a candidate to replace Will Muschamp, who left Texas for Florida. On New Year's Day, Wilcox announced that he would return to Tennessee for the 2011 season.

Early on January 2, 2012, reports emerged that Wilcox was to become the new defensive coordinator at Washington in Seattle, under head coach Steve Sarkisian. The position was vacant due to Nick Holt's termination days earlier, and the announcement was made official later that night. The Huskies were 7–6 in 2012 and lost in the Las Vegas Bowl. Washington was 9–4 in 2013 and won the Fight Hunger Bowl; Sarkisian left after the regular season for USC.

Wilcox followed Sarkisian to USC and was the defensive coordinator; the Trojans went 9–4 in 2014 and won the Holiday Bowl. After five games in 2015, Sarkisian was fired and succeeded by Clay Helton. The Trojans finished 50th nationally in scoring defense (25.7 points per game) and 65th in total defense (400.8 yards per game) in 2015, and Wilcox was terminated the day after the loss to Stanford in the Pac-12 championship game.

On January 28, 2016, Wilcox became the defensive coordinator at Wisconsin, under head coach Paul Chryst. The Badgers went 11–3 and won the Cotton Bowl with a defense ranked in the top ten in a number of categories.

California
On January 14, 2017, Wilcox was introduced as the 34th head coach of the California Golden Bears. The Bears went 5–7 during Wilcox's first year in 2017, with wins over North Carolina, Ole Miss, and #8 Washington State, and three losses by three points or fewer.

The Bears went 7–6 during Wilcox's second year in 2018. The Bears upset #15 Washington 12–10 and defeated USC 15–14 at the Coliseum in Los Angeles to snap a 14-year losing streak to the Trojans. The Bears lost 10–7 in overtime to TCU in the 2018 Cheez-It Bowl. In contrast to his predecessor, Sonny Dykes, Wilcox emphasized a strong defense, cutting Cal's points allowed per game from 42.6 (2016) to 20.4 (2018). However, the Bears’ offensive efficiency ranked as the second worst among all Power Five teams.  After the regular season, Wilcox signed a new five-year contract to coach the Bears through the 2023 season.

The Bears improved to an 8–5 record under Wilcox in 2019. They achieved their highest ranking since 2009 when they were ranked No. 15 after a 4–0 start to the season. After defeating Stanford in the Big Game for the first time since 2009, the Bears earned bowl-eligibility two years in a row, again for the first time since 2009. The Bears defeated Illinois 35–20 in the 2019 Redbox Bowl.

The Bears finished 1–3 in a COVID-shortened 2020 season, with their lone win coming against #21 Oregon.  In 2021, the Bears went 5–7, including wins over USC and Stanford. Cal notched a Big Game record 636 total yards of offense in a 41–11 victory over Stanford.  Following the season, Wilcox signed a new contract extension keeping him at Cal through the 2027 season.

Family
Wilcox is the son of Dave Wilcox, an All-Pro linebacker for the San Francisco 49ers and a member of the Pro Football Hall of Fame. Inducted in 2000, he played 11 seasons in the National Football League (NFL), from 1964 to 1974, all with the 49ers. From Vale in eastern Oregon, Dave played college football at Boise Junior College, then transferred to Oregon in 1962.

Justin's brother, Josh Wilcox, was three years ahead in school and played tight end for the Ducks and two seasons in the NFL with the New Orleans Saints.  Justin's uncle John Wilcox also played in the NFL, in the early 1960s.

Head coaching record

References

External links
 California profile

1976 births
Living people
American football defensive backs
Boise State Broncos football coaches
California Golden Bears football coaches
Oregon Ducks football coaches
Oregon Ducks football players
Tennessee Volunteers football coaches
USC Trojans football coaches
Washington Huskies football coaches
Sportspeople from Eugene, Oregon
People from Junction City, Oregon
Coaches of American football from Oregon
Players of American football from Oregon